Hugo Miranda may refer to:

 Hugo Miranda (footballer) (born 1980), Paraguayan footballer
 Hugo Miranda (cyclist) (born 1925), Chilean cyclist
 Hugo Sánchez Miranda (born 1968), Mexican politician